Aurelia Castillo de González (known in Cuba as "nuestra Madame de Sévigné"; 1842–1920) was a Cuban writer. She wrote short stories, poems, prose, and was also a typographer, biographer, editor, and travel writer.

Biography
Aurelia Castillo de González was born in Camagüey in 1842, spent much time in European travel, and then settled in Havana.  She first attracted literary attention by her elegy on "El Lugareno" in 1866, and since that time, became an incessant contributor to Cuban literature in verse and prose.  She was the author of a study of the life and works of Gertrudis Gómez de Avellaneda, of a volume of fables, and a number of satires.  Five volumes of her works were published in 1913. Among her work is the translation of the book La hija de Yorio by Gabriele D'Annunzio. Castillo de González founded the Academia de Artes y Letras (Academy of Arts and Letters). She died in Camagüey in 1920.

References

Attribution

Bibliography

1842 births
1920 deaths
19th-century Cuban women writers
Cuban women poets
Cuban women short story writers
Cuban poets
Cuban short story writers
Cuban editors
People from Camagüey
Typographers and type designers
Women biographers
Women travel writers
20th-century Cuban women writers